Mocca is an Indonesian jazz and swing band.

Reception 
Rolling Stone Indonesia magazine placed My Diary on their "The 150 Greatest Indonesian Albums of All Time list at No. 59. The magazine also ranked Mocca's song, "Me and My Boyfriend" at No. 150 on "The 150 Greatest Indonesian Songs of All Time" list.

Band members 

Arina Ephipania Simangunsong (vocals and flute) was born on 4 May, 1978 in Bandung, West Java, where she graduated with a Bachelor of Arts degree from the National Institute of Technology (Bandung) alongside bandmate Riko Prayitno. The two founded Mocca in 1997.

Riko Prayitno (guitar) was born on 29 January, 1977 in Bogor, West Java. He graduated from the National Institute of Technology. He began playing guitar at an early age and began playing professionally with Simangunsong in college. He also had a side project, The Triangle Band.

Ahmad Pratama (a.k.a. Toma) (bass) was born on 27 June, 1976 in Bandung, West Java. A product designer by training, Toma set up the key components of their music. His punctual bass tone accentuates the tempo and rhythm set by Indra's drumming. His influences include Sting and Phil Collins.

Indra Massad (drums) was born on 31 January, 1976 in Medan, North Sumatra. He and Toma studied product design in Bandung together and joined Mocca at roughly the same time.

Additional members

Current members
 Ardiansyah — trombone (2002–present)
 Akbari "Bane" Hakim  — trumpet (2020–present)
 Agung Nugraha — keyboards (2002–present)
 Indra Kusumah — keyboards and guitar, occasional (2015–present)
 Yonathan Godjali — keyboards, (2020–present)

Former members
 Ronald Tommy Pangemanan — trumpet (2002-2019)

Discography 
 My Diary (2002)
 Friends (2004)
 OST Untuk Rena (2005)
 Colours (2007)
 Mini Album (also known as Dear Friends or Mocca) (2010)
 Home (2014)
 Lima (Five in Indonesian) (2018)
 Day by Day (2020)
 Funfair EP (2021)

References

External links
 Official website
 Official record label

Indonesian jazz music groups
Anugerah Musik Indonesia winners
Musical groups established in 1997
1997 establishments in Indonesia